This is a list of the Romania national football team's unofficial results, including Romania B from their inception to the present day that are not accorded the status of official internationals. Player appearances and goals in these matches are also not counted to their total.

1919

1930

1939

1959

1964

1970

1971

1977

1978

1979

1982

1984

1985

1987

1990

1991

1992

1993

1994

1995

1996

2000

2002

2004

2008

2013

2015

References

All details are sourced to the match reports cited, unless otherwise specified:

External links
Romanian Football Federation
World Referee - Matches featuring Romania
EU-Football - international football match results of Romania 1922-present

List of full international results at RSSSF.com

Unofficial
Lists of national association football team unofficial results